Rustam Iskandari (born 18 August 1991 in Kulyab) is a Tajikistani freestyle wrestler. He competed in the freestyle 96 kg event at the 2012 Summer Olympics; he was defeated by Valerii Andriitsev in the 1/8 finals and eliminated by Khetag Gazyumov in the repechage round.

References

External links
 

1991 births
Living people
Tajikistani male sport wrestlers
Olympic wrestlers of Tajikistan
Wrestlers at the 2012 Summer Olympics
People from Khatlon Region
Wrestlers at the 2014 Asian Games
Wrestlers at the 2018 Asian Games
Asian Games competitors for Tajikistan
21st-century Tajikistani people